Tell the Truth and Run: George Seldes and the American Press is a 1996 documentary film about the author and critic George Seldes directed by Rick Goldsmith. It was nominated for an Academy Award for Best Documentary Feature.

Critical reception
Todd McCarthy from Variety wrote "The supreme iconoclast among 20th century American journalists, George Seldes, receives a well-earned, enthusiastic tribute in this useful documentary, even if the portrait feels somewhat incomplete. Currently on the fest and benefit circuit, pic is viable for short theatrical stints in situations open to political, historical and, tangentially, Jewish-themed fare, but will have a much longer life on public TV, cable and video."

References

External links
 
 Film website
 Tell the Truth and Run: George Seldes and the American Press at New Day Films
 Listing at Snag Films
 Review of the film in Variety

1996 films
1996 documentary films
American documentary films
American black-and-white films
Documentary films about journalists
1990s English-language films
1990s American films